This is a List of transportation units of the United States Army from the Transportation Corps.

Brigades

Battalions

Transportation Motor Transport Battalion
The transportation motor transport battalion is designed to support the movement of personnel and matériel for divisions and corps in an area of operation.  It is normally attached to a sustainment brigade and consists of a headquarters and headquarters detachment providing command and control of between three to seven motor transport companies, detachments or teams.

Movement Control Battalion
The movement control battalion is charged with regulating all movement within its area of operation, including along the main supply route (MSR) and alternate supply routes (ASR).  Subordinate to the Theater Sustainment Command and/or Expeditionary Sustainment Command, it is a vital component in the planning and execution of deployment, redeployment and distribution operations.  The battalion exercises control of between four to ten movement control teams, which are assigned to key areas or transportation nodes.

Companies

Motor Transport Company
Motor transport companies provide for the transport of personnel and a variety of commodities, including petroleum products, bulk cargo, and containers.  They normally operate as part of a transportation battalion, a Combat Sustainment Support Battalion (CSSB) or Division Sustainment Support Battalion (DSSB).  There are four basic types of motor companies:

Light-Medium Truck Company
The light-medium truck company provides for transportation of bulk cargo, containers and personnel using the Family of Medium Tactical Vehicles (FMTV).  It may operate as part of a motor transport battalion, a CSSB or a DSSB.  It consists of a headquarters platoon, a light-medium truck platoon, a medium truck platoon, and a maintenance section.  Vehicle complement comprises 50 medium tactical vehicle cargo trucks, including the M1078 and M1083 variants, along with 25 trailers of the same payload capacity; and 10 M1088 medium tactical vehicle tractor trucks with 20 M871 trailers.  Its total one-time lift capability is 225 short tons of breakbulk cargo; 404 short tons of breakbulk ammunition; 440 pallets; 10 TEU; or 600 personnel with gear.

Medium Truck Company
Medium truck companies come in six different varieties, whether they provide for the transport of general cargo, petroleum products, or containers.  Their organization is the same, with a headquarters platoon, three medium truck platoons, and a maintenance section.

PLS Truck Company
The Palletized Load System is designed to provide ground transportation for dry and refrigerated containers with a container roll-in/roll-out platform (CROP) or other types of cargo on PLS flatracks.  When equipped with tank racks or load handling system compatible water tank racks (HIPPOs) it can also transport bulk petroleum products or water.  Standard complement is 60 PLS trucks, 60 PLS trailers, and 360 flatracks or CROPs, giving it a one-time lift capability of 421 short tons of breakbulk cargo; 757 short tons of breakbulk ammunition; 960 pallets; 120 TEU; 240,000 gallons of bulk water; or 300,000 gallons of bulk fuel.

Medium Truck Company Cargo
The medium truck company cargo is designed to provide transport for containerized and non-containerized cargo, including palletized bulk water or refrigerated cargo.  Two types of medium truck cargo companies exist.  The first is composed of 60 M915 series tractor trucks and 120 M872 40 ft semitrailers, generally used for line haul operations but also capable of local operations.  In addition to handling dry or refrigerated cargo, the trailer can be fitted with a mounted fabric tank  to transport 4,750 gallons of water or a HIPPO carrying 2,000 gallons along with integrated pump, engine and hose reel.  Its one-time lift capability is 447 short tons of breakbulk cargo; 803 short tons of ammunition; 1,080 pallets, 120 TEU, 247,200 gallons of using fabric tanks; or 240,000 gallons of water using HIPPOs.  The second comprises 60 M1088 medium tactical vehicle tractor trucks with 120 M871 trailers, with a one-time lift capability of 288 short tons of breakbulk cargo; 517 short tons of breakbulk ammunition; 840 pallets; 60 TEU; or 180,000 gallons of water using fabric tanks or HIPPOs.

Medium Truck Company POL
The medium truck company POL's mission is the transport of petroleum, oil, and lubricant (POL) products to distribution points.  Three different types of POL companies exist.  The medium truck company POL (7.5k) EAB Line Haul provides for line haul transportation of bulk fuel, consisting of 60 M915 trucks with 60 7.5k trailers with a total transport capacity of 450,000 gallons.  The medium truck company POL (5k) Line Haul is equipped with 60 M915 tractor trucks and 60 5k trailers for a total transport capacity of 300,000 gallons. The medium truck company POL (5k) EAB Tactical provides both line haul and local operations, utilizing 60 M1088 tractor trucks and 60 M967 5k trailers with a total transport capacity of 300,000 gallons.

Heavy Truck Company
The mission of the Heavy Equipment Transport System (HET) company is the port clearance, tactical movement and recovery of heavy maneuver forces.  Operating as part of a transportation battalion or CSSB, it consists of a headquarter platoon, four HET platoons, and a maintenance platoon.  Vehicle compliment includes 96 HET systems, each comprising a M1070 truck tractor and M1000 semitrailer.  The company is also equipped with medium equipment trailers design to transport loads 60 tons or less.

Composite Truck Company
Composite truck companies provide tailored support to division and corps elements with a combination of FMTV and PLS trucks.  The composite truck company (heavy) provides support for armored divisions and consists of a headquarters platoon, a medium tactical vehicle platoon for 20 FMTVs, two PLS platoons for 40 PLS trucks and trailers, a HET platoon for 18 HET systems, and a maintenance section.  The composite truck company (light) is designed to support light divisions and has the same composition minus the HET platoon.  Both types of companies also include 20 MRAP vehicles.

Detachments

References

Citations

Bibliography

 
Transportation